Xylopia longifolia is a species of plant in the Annonaceae family. It is endemic to Panama.  It is threatened by habitat loss.

References

Flora of Panama
longifolia
Endangered plants
Taxonomy articles created by Polbot